Debdou (Berber: ⴷⴻⴱⴷⵓ) is a town in Morocco. It is known for its multi-ethnic population, including Berbers and Moroccan Jews.

The Ait Urtajjen, a Berber family related to the Moroccan dynasty of the Wattasids, had their own semi-independent state here from 1430 until 1563.

Jewish centre

Debdou was a major Jewish centre in Morocco. The town was settled by many Sephardic Jews from Seville, fleeing the wave of anti-Jewish riots in Spain in 1391. The earliest to settle were the clan of Cohen-Scali who reached Debdou in 1465, a family of Jewish priests said to trace their lineage to Zadok, the High Priest.

At the end of the 19th and beginning of the 20th century the town was briefly renowned as a centre of Jewish learning, exporting rabbis to many cities in Morocco.

At the end of the 19th century the town's population was estimated at 2000 inhabitants, most of them Jews.

At the beginning of the 20th century the number of Jews was estimated at 1600, who formed roughly a third of the population.

Following the establishment of the French protectorate, with the concomitant rise in security, the majority of the Jewish population gradually emigrated to nearby towns in the plains.

Gallery

References

External links 
  C. El Briga, « Debdou », Encyclopédie berbère, vol.15, Edisud 1995, p. 2254-2255

Populated places in Taourirt Province
Municipalities of Morocco
Historic Jewish communities
Jews and Judaism in Morocco

Morocco geography articles needing translation from French Wikipedia